Call Me is the sixth album by soul singer Al Green. It is widely regarded as Green's masterpiece, and has been called one of the best soul albums ever made. In 2003 the TV network VH1 named it the 70th greatest album in any genre.  Call Me was a Top 10 Billboard Pop Album, and the third #1 Soul Album.
In 2003, the album was ranked number 289 on Rolling Stone magazine's list of the 500 greatest albums of all time, and 290 in a 2012 revised list. Praised for his emotive singing style, Green here incorporates country influences, covering both Willie Nelson and Hank Williams. This album contained three top 10 singles on the Billboard Hot 100: "You Ought to Be with Me," "Here I Am (Come and Take Me)" and "Call Me (Come Back Home)."

Track listing

Personnel 
 Al Green	 – 	vocals, producer
 Willie Mitchell	 – 	producer, engineer
 Charles Chalmers	 – 	background vocals, horn arrangements
 Margaret Goldfarb	 – 	assistant producer
 Howard Grimes	 – 	drums
 Jack Hale, Sr.	 – 	trombone
 Charles Hodges	 – 	Hammond organ, piano
 Leroy Hodges	 – 	bass
 Mabon "Teenie" Hodges	 – 	guitar
 Wayne Jackson	 – 	trumpet
 Kathy Kinslow	 – 	assistant producer
 Charles Levan	 – 	assistant producer
 Ed Logan	 – 	tenor saxophone
 Andrew Love	 – 	tenor saxophone
 The Memphis Strings	 – 	strings
 James Mitchell	 – baritone saxophone, horn arrangements
 Bud O'Shea	 – 	executive producer
 Eli Okun	 – 	executive producer
 Cheryl Pawelski	 – 	assistant producer
 Donna Rhodes	 – 	background vocals
 Sandra Rhodes	 – 	background vocals
 Archie Turner	 – 	piano
 Al Jackson Jr.	 – 	drums
 Robert Gordon	 – 	liner notes
Jim Cummins - photography

Chart positions

Billboard Music Charts (North America) – album 
 1973	Pop Albums	                No. 10
 1973	Black Albums	                No. 1

Billboard (North America) – singles 
 1972	"You Ought To Be With Me"	        Pop Singles	                No. 3
 1972	"You Ought To Be With Me"	        Black Singles	                No. 1
 1973	"Call Me (Come Back Home)"	Pop Singles	                No. 10
 1973	"Here I Am (Come And Take Me)"	Pop Singles	                No. 10
 1973	"Call Me (Come Back Home)"	Black Singles	                No. 2
 1973	"Here I Am (Come And Take Me)"	Black Singles	                No. 2

Later samples 
 "Here I Am (Come And Take Me)"
 "Slang Editorial" by Cappadonna from the album The Pillage
 "You Ought To Be With Me"
 "260" by Ghostface Killah from the album Ironman

See also
List of number-one R&B albums of 1973 (U.S.)

References 

1973 albums
Al Green albums
Albums produced by Willie Mitchell (musician)
Hi Records albums